Aleksei Tikhonkikh may refer to:

 Aleksei Tikhonkikh (gymnast), Soviet gymnast in 1985 World Artistic Gymnastics Championships
 Aleksei Vladimirovich Tikhonkikh (b. 1977), Russian footballer